Georges Niang (born June 17, 1993), nicknamed "The Minivan", is a Senegalese-American professional basketball player for the Philadelphia 76ers of the National Basketball Association (NBA). He was an All-American college player for Iowa State University.

High school career
A three-year starter and two-year team captain, Niang capped off his career as one of the greatest players in The Tilton School history, amassing a school-record 2,372 points.  He was a three-time First-Team All-NEPSAC Class AA pick, Niang was the 2012 NEPSAC Class AA Player of the Year. He averaged 25.1 points, 7.2 rebounds, and 2.1 assists per game as a senior, averaged 24.2 points and 8.2 rebounds as a junior and led his team to the 2011 NEPSAC Class AA championship with a 72-56 win over St. Mark's.  He was named outstanding player of the tournament, scoring 23 points on 11-of-11 shooting from the field in the championship game.  His team lost in the 2011 National Prep Championship to Notre Dame Prep (87-85), as Niang scored 31 points. He played for the Boston-based BABC AAU team, the same program that featured former Cyclone and NBA player Will Blalock. His BABC squad won the 2011 Nike Peach Jam, one of the most competitive AAU tournaments in the country. He was teammates at Tilton and in AAU with Nerlens Noel, they won four NEPSAC titles, one national prep championship, one AAU national championship and one Nike EYBL title in his career.

Niang was considered one of the best players on the East Coast, ending his prep career as a consensus national top-100 recruit. He was ranked No. 42 by Lindy's, No. 56 by ESPNU, No. 69 by Scout.com, No. 69 by Rivals.com, No. 73 by Sporting News, and No. 81 by CBS Sports in the 2012 prep national rankings.  He also had offers from Iowa, Providence, Texas A&M, and Seton Hall, eventually committing to Iowa State.

College career

Niang was named to the Big 12 All-Rookie Team in his freshman year in 2013.  In the second round of the 2014 NCAA tournament, Niang broke the fifth metatarsal in his right foot, forcing him to sit for the remainder of the event. As a sophomore, he averaged 16.7 points and 4.5 rebounds as the third most prominent offensive weapon for Iowa State behind Melvin Ejim and DeAndre Kane.

Niang cut back on his calorie consumption in the 2014 offseason and consequently slimmed down to 230 pounds from 260 pounds. As a junior, Niang led the team in scoring with 15.3 points per game to go along with 5.4 rebounds and 3.4 assists per game. Seeded third in the 2015 NCAA tournament, the Cyclones were upset by 14th seeded UAB in the round of 64 despite 11 points and seven rebounds from Niang. He considered entering the 2015 NBA Draft, but instead decided to return for his senior season. "I was weighing it, but I want to be loyal to the program and didn't want to go out this way," Niang said. "I didn't want to leave my mark like that."

Niang surpassed the 2,000-point threshold as a senior, averaging 20.2 points and 6.2 rebounds per game. He was named to the 35-man midseason watchlist for the Naismith College Player of the Year on February 11.

During his college career, Niang achieved a number program records, including the first player to reach four straight NCAA tournaments, the first two-time All-American, the career leader in games played (138) and most wins (98).

Professional career

Indiana Pacers (2016–2017)
On June 23, 2016, Niang was selected by the Indiana Pacers with the 50th overall pick in the 2016 NBA draft. He joined the team for the 2016 NBA Summer League, where his early play drew praise from Larry Bird. On July 11, 2016, he signed with the Pacers. During his rookie season, he had multiple assignments with the Fort Wayne Mad Ants of the NBA Development League. On July 14, 2017, he was waived by the Pacers.

Santa Cruz Warriors (2017–2018)
On August 16, 2017, Niang signed an Exhibit 10 contract with the Golden State Warriors. He was waived by the Warriors on October 14, 2017. He subsequently joined the Santa Cruz Warriors as an affiliate player.

Utah Jazz (2018–2021)
On January 14, 2018, Niang signed a two-way contract with the Utah Jazz to take up a spot previously held by former college teammate Naz Mitrou-Long. Throughout the rest of the season, he split his playing time between the Jazz and their NBA G League affiliate, the Salt Lake City Stars.

On July 13, 2018, Niang signed a standard contract with the Jazz.

Niang scored a career high 24 points against the Los Angeles Clippers on April 10, 2019. He also notched a 24 point game against the Houston Rockets on May 8, 2021.

Philadelphia 76ers (2021–present)
On August 9, 2021, Niang signed a 2-year, $6.7 million contract with the Philadelphia 76ers.

Career statistics

NBA

Regular season

|-
| align="left" | 
| align="left" | Indiana
| 23 || 0 || 4.0 || .250 || .083 || 1.000 || .7 || .2 || .1 || .0 || .9
|-
| align="left" | 
| align="left" | Utah
| 9 || 0 || 3.6 || .364 || .000 || .500 || 1.0 || .3 || .2 || .0 || 1.0
|-
| align="left" | 
| align="left" | Utah
| 59 || 0 || 8.7 || .475 || .410 || .833 || 1.5 || .6 || .2 || .1 || 4.0
|-
| align="left" | 
| align="left" | Utah
| 66 || 1 || 14.0 || .438 || .400 || .833 || 1.9 || .7 || .3 || .1 || 5.9
|-
| align="left" | 
| align="left" | Utah
| 72 || 10 || 16.0 || .437 || .425 || .957 || 2.4 || .8 || .3 || .1 || 6.9
|-
| align="left" | 
| align="left" | Philadelphia
| 76 || 7 || 22.8 || .437 || .403 || .881 || 2.7 || 1.3 || .4 || .2 || 9.2
|- class="sortbottom"
| style="text-align:center;" colspan="2"| Career
| 305 || 18 || 14.6 || .437 || .404 || .873 || 2.0 || .8 || .3 || .1 || 6.1

Playoffs

|-
| style="text-align:left;"| 2019
| style="text-align:left;"| Utah
| 5 || 0 || 11.0 || .409 || .308 || — || 2.8 || 1.0 || .2 || .2 || 4.4
|-
| style="text-align:left;"| 2020
| style="text-align:left;"| Utah
| 7 || 0 || 16.3 || .500 || .414 || 1.000 || 2.1 || .6 || .0 || .1 || 8.3
|-
| style="text-align:left;"| 2021
| style="text-align:left;"| Utah
| 11 || 0 || 11.7 || .282 || .300 || 1.000 || 1.7 || .7 || .0 || .1 || 3.2
|-
| style="text-align:left;"| 2022
| style="text-align:left;"| Philadelphia
| 12 || 0 || 16.5 || .417 || .372 || 1.000 || 1.5 || .9 || .3 || .0 || 4.8
|- class="sortbottom"
| style="text-align:center;" colspan="2"| Career
| 35 || 0 || 14.2 || .405 || .357 || 1.000 || 1.9 || .8 || .1 || .1 || 4.9

College

|-
| style="text-align:left;"| 2012–13
| style="text-align:left;"| Iowa State
| 35 || 23 || 25.1 || .515 || .392 || .700 || 4.6 || 1.8 || .7 || .2 || 12.1
|-
| style="text-align:left;"| 2013–14
| style="text-align:left;"| Iowa State
| 34 || 34 || 30.1 || .474 || .327 || .721 || 4.5 || 3.6 || .6 || .6 || 16.7
|-
| style="text-align:left;"| 2014–15
| style="text-align:left;"| Iowa State
| 34 || 34 || 30.7 || .461 || .400 || .808 || 5.4 || 3.4 || .5 || .5 || 15.3
|-
| style="text-align:left;"| 2015–16
| style="text-align:left;"| Iowa State
| 34 || 34 || 33.2 || .546 || .390 || .813 || 6.2 || 3.3 || .9 || .6 || 20.2
|- class="sortbottom"
| style="text-align:center;" colspan="2"| Career
| 121 || 109 || 29.2 || .490 || .375 || .762 || 5.1 || 3.0 || .6 || .5 || 15.4

Personal life
Niang is the son of Sidy and Alison Niang. His father was born and raised in Senegal. He was elected student body president at Tilton Prep.

References

External links
 Iowa State Cyclones bio
 Georges Niang at draftexpress.com
 

1993 births
Living people
21st-century African-American sportspeople
African-American basketball players
All-American college men's basketball players
American men's basketball players
American people of Senegalese descent
American sportspeople of African descent
Sportspeople of Senegalese descent
Basketball players from Massachusetts
Fort Wayne Mad Ants players
Forwards (basketball)
Indiana Pacers draft picks
Indiana Pacers players
Iowa State Cyclones men's basketball players
National Basketball Association players from Senegal
Philadelphia 76ers players
Salt Lake City Stars players
Santa Cruz Warriors players
Senegalese men's basketball players
Sportspeople from Lawrence, Massachusetts
Utah Jazz players
Tilton School alumni